Romina is a feminine given name of Italian origin. Notable people with the name include:

Romina Arena (born 1980), Italian–American singer-songwriter
Romina Armellini (born 1984), Italian swimmer
Romina Basso, Italian opera singer
Romina Bell, Austrian footballer
Romina Belluscio (born 1979), Argentine TV presenter
Romina Contiero (born 1983), Italian singer and dancer
Romina D'Ugo, Canadian dancer and actress
Romina Daniele (born 1980), Italian singer and composer
Romina Falconi (born 1985), Italian singer and songwriter
Romina Ferro (born 1980), Argentine footballer
Romina Goldszmid, Argentine-American biologist
Romina Holz (born 1988), German footballer
Romina Johnson (born 1973), London-based Italian–American singer
Romina Lanaro (born 1986), Argentine model
Romina Laurito (born 1987), Italian rhythmic gymnast
Romina de Novellis (born 1982), Italian performance artist
Romina Oprandi (born 1986), Swiss–Italian tennis player
Romina Plataroti (born 1979), Argentine gymnast
Romina Power (born 1951), American actress and singer
Romina Stefancic (born 1978), Slovenian–Canadian rower
Romina Tejerina (born 1983), Argentine murderer
Romina Uhrig (born 1988), Argentine politician
Romina Yan (1974–2010), Argentine singer, dancer, and actress
Romina LB (born 2003), British-Italian zoologist

Other
Romina (telenovela), a 1980 Argentine telenovela

See also
Roma (given name)
Roman (disambiguation)

References

Italian feminine given names